A staatslijn (English: state line) is a railway that was established as a result of the railway law passed on 18 August 1860 by the State in the Netherlands. 10 of these lines were built and utilized by the Maatschappij tot Exploitatie van Staatsspoorwegen. These are:

Staatslijn A: Arnhem–Leeuwarden railway
Staatslijn B: Harlingen–Nieuweschans railway
Staatslijn C: Meppel–Groningen railway
Staatslijn D: Zutphen–Glanerbeek railway
Staatslijn E: Breda–Eindhoven railway, Venlo–Eindhoven railway and Maastricht–Venlo railway
Staatslijn F: Roosendaal–Vlissingen railway
Staatslijn G: Dutch part of the Viersen–Venlo railway
Staatslijn H: Utrecht–Boxtel railway
Staatslijn I: Breda–Rotterdam railway
Staatslijn K: Den Helder–Amsterdam railway

Railway lines in the Netherlands